Multimax may refer to:

 Multimax, parallel computer from Encore Computer, released in 1985
 MultiMAX, trailers for oversize load transportation made by the Faymonville Group
 Multimax, Air Force contractor acquired by Netco Government Services

See also 
 Minimax